The 503d Aircraft Control and Warning Group (AC&WG) is an inactive United States Air Force unit.  Its last assignment was with Air Defense Command (ADC)'s 26th Air Division at Roslyn AFS New York.   It was inactivated in 1952.

History
Activated as an ADC Aircraft Control and Warning Group, forming radar squadrons in the late 1940s and the early 1950s and deploying them around the New York, New Jersey area under First Air Force and the 26th Air Division.  On 16 April 1950, the reserve 563d Aircraft Control and Warning Group was activated as a Corollary unit at Roslyn, sharing the 503d's equipment and facilities.  The 563d was called to active duty on 2 June 1951 and was inactivated, with its personnel used as fillers for the 503d.

Lineage
 Constituted as the 503d Aircraft Warning Group, 1 April 1948
 Activated on 1 April 1948
 Redesignated 503d Aircraft Control and Warning Group, 6 December 1949
 Inactivated on 6 February 1952
 Disbanded on 21 September 1984.

Assignments
 26th Air Division, 16 November 1948 – 6 February 1952

Components

 645th Aircraft Control and Warning Squadron
 Mitchel Field, New York, 30 April 1948-1 January 1951
 646th Aircraft Control and Warning Squadron
 Highlands AFS, New Jersey, 1 June 1948-6 February 1952
 647th Aircraft Control and Warning Squadron
 Fort George G. Meade, Maryland, 1 January 1951-6 February 1952
 648th Aircraft Control and Warning Squadron
 Mud Pond, Pennsylvania, 1 January 1951-6 February 1952
 658th Aircraft Control and Warning Squadron
 Santini, New York, 1 January 1951-6 February 1952

 770th Aircraft Warning and Control Squadron
 Palermo AFS, New Jersey, 1 January 1951-6 February 1952
 771st Aircraft Control and Warning Squadron
 Cape Charles AFS, Virginia, 1 January 1951-6 February 1952
 772d Aircraft Control and Warning Squadron
 Connellsville, Pennsylvania, 1 January 1951-6 February 1952
 773d Aircraft Control and Warning Squadron
 Camp Hero, New York, 1 June 1948-6 December 1949

Stations
 Fort Slocum (later, Slocum AFB),  1 April 1948
 Roslyn AFS, New York, 1 January 1951 – 6 February 1952

See also
 List of USAF Aerospace Defense Command General Surveillance Radar Stations
 Aerospace Defense Command Fighter Squadrons
 List of United States Air Force aircraft control and warning squadrons

References

 
 Grant, C.L., The Development of Continental Air Defense to 1 September 1954, (1961), USAF Historical Study No. 126
 

Air control groups of the United States Air Force
Military units and formations disestablished in 1952